Dimitris Koutsopoulos (born 20 April 1978) is a Greek footballer. He currently plays for AO Sellana.

Career
His skills induced him to sign his first professional contract with Paniliakos F.C. After a short stay in the Peloponnesian team he moved to Naousa FC, however his big step forward was when he returned to Karditsa to play for his native team Anagennisi Karditsa in Beta Ethniki. Kotsiopoulos played for "Kanaria" for 2,5 years and he moved to Paniliakos F.C. again in the half of 2001/02 season, when Anagennisi Karditsa relegated to Gamma Ethniki. He then moved to another club of Peloponnese called Leonidio to return for third time to Paniliakos in 2003/04 season when they promoted to Greek Superleague. When Paniliakos F.C. relegated to Beta Ethniki in 2004, Koutsopoulos signed for Messiniakos F.C. and played there for four years. In 2008, he signed for Apollon Kalamarias with the team aiming the immediate comeback to Greek Superleague. Financial trouble led the team in Delta Ethniki and Koutsopoulos released and signed on a free transfer by Anagennisi Karditsa in summer 2009. His reflexes and the ability to set up the defence are mainly his virtues which include him in the top goalkeepers in Beta Ethniki. He has already played 18 games this season, saving two penalties and helping "ASA" in difficult moments. His brother, Vangelis Koutsopoulos is also a football player.

References

1978 births
Living people
Greek footballers
Paniliakos F.C. players
Naoussa F.C. players
Anagennisi Karditsa F.C. players
Leonidio F.C. players
Messiniakos F.C. players
Apollon Pontou FC players
Panthrakikos F.C. players
Apollon Smyrnis F.C. players
Super League Greece players
Association football goalkeepers
Footballers from Karditsa